ZIC1 is a member of the Zinc finger of the cerebellum (ZIC) protein family.

ZIC1 is classified as a ZIC protein due to conservation of the five C2H2 zinc fingers, which enables the protein to interact with DNA and proteins. ZIC1 is found in close genomic configuration in another member of this protein family, ZIC4. Correct function of these proteins is critical for early development, and as such mutations of the genes encoding these proteins is known to result in various congenital defects. For example, if function of both ZIC1 and ZIC4 is lost (which can occur via an interstitial deletion due to their adjacent location) then this may result in the Dandy–Walker malformation.

Interactions
ZIC1 has been shown to interact with GLI1 and GLI3.

References

Further reading